"Lynda" is a song written by Bill LaBounty and Pat McLaughlin, and recorded by American country music artist Steve Wariner.  It was released in August 1987 as the third single from the album It's a Crazy World.  The song was Wariner's seventh number one single.  The single went to number one for one week and spent a total of twenty-three weeks on the chart.

Content
"Lynda" is composed in the key of D major, mainly around the chord pattern D-Bm-G-A4. The song's success led to co-writer Pat McLaughlin signing to Capitol Records.

Charts

References

Songs about actors
1987 singles
1986 songs
Steve Wariner songs
Songs written by Bill LaBounty
Songs written by Pat McLaughlin
Song recordings produced by Tony Brown (record producer)
MCA Records singles